Ali Baba and the Seven Saracens (also known as Sinbad Against the 7 Saracens) is a 1964 Italian adventure film written and directed  by Emimmo Salvi and starring Gordon Mitchell. The film was released straight to television in the United States by American International Television in 1965.

Plot

A rebel leader returns to his city for a final confrontation with the evil king he is fighting. However, he finds himself attracted to the king's beautiful niece

Cast

References

External links

Italian adventure films
1964 adventure films
1960s Italian films